Nyceryx nephus is a moth of the  family Sphingidae. It is known from Brazil.

The forewing and hindwing upperside is similar to Nyceryx alophus alophus, but the marginal band on the hindwing upperside is broader and has traces of brown spots.

Adults are probably on wing year round.

References

Nyceryx
Moths described in 1875